Doru Năstase (2 February 1933 - 29 April 1983) was a Romanian film director and actor.  He was best known for his historical films, such No Trespassing and Vlad the Impaler.

Filmography

As director
1975: No Trespassing (Pe aici nu se trece)
1977: Războiul independenței
1979: Vlad Țepeș
1982: Drumul oaselor
1983: The Mysteries of Bucharest (Misterele Bucureștilor) 
1984: The Yellow Rose (Trandafirul galben)

As Assistant Director
1968: The Last Roman
1969: Kampf um Rom II - Der Verrat
1971: Decolarea
1971: Michael the Brave

Actor
1979: Mihail, câine de circ

References

External links

1933 births
1983 deaths
Film people from Bucharest
Romanian film directors
Romanian male film actors
20th-century Romanian male actors